Safuan Said (born 1982) is a Malaysian international Lawn bowler.

Bowls career
He won the lawn bowls gold medal in the singles competition at the 2008 World Outdoor Bowls Championship in Christchurch, New Zealand and a bronze medal in the pairs with Fairul Izwan Abd Muin.

He has also won five medals at the Asia Pacific Bowls Championships including two singles gold medals in 2005 and 2011 and a gold medal in the pairs event at the 2005 Southeast Asian Games in Angeles City.

Indoors, he won the 2005 World Junior Cup and also won the gold medal at the 2008 World Cup Singles in Warilla, New South Wales, Australia.

References

Living people
1982 births
Malaysian male bowls players
Bowls World Champions
Commonwealth Games medallists in lawn bowls
Commonwealth Games bronze medallists for Malaysia
Southeast Asian Games medalists in lawn bowls
Southeast Asian Games gold medalists for Malaysia
Southeast Asian Games silver medalists for Malaysia
Southeast Asian Games bronze medalists for Malaysia
Bowls players at the 2002 Commonwealth Games
Competitors at the 2005 Southeast Asian Games
Competitors at the 2007 Southeast Asian Games
Competitors at the 2017 Southeast Asian Games
Medallists at the 2002 Commonwealth Games